Aylesbury UTC is a university technical college (UTC) which opened in September 2013 in Aylesbury, Buckinghamshire, England. In November 2021, the college joined a Multi-Academy Trust. In 2022, the school underwent a rebrand and name-change from Bucks UTC. The college specialises in computing, construction and health, for 14–19 year olds.

Location 
Aylesbury UTC is located near the Aylesbury Train Station and the bus station and shopping center. It is based next to Aylesbury College and Sir Henry Floyd Grammar School, in Aylesbury, Buckinghamshire, England.

History 
Aylesbury UTC moved to the leadership of Merchant Taylors' Oxfordshire Academy Trust in November 2021. A new Principal, Nick Lamb, was also appointed that month. He replaced Sarah Valentine, who left the UTC in October 2021.

In 2022, the UTC changed its name from Bucks UTC to Aylesbury UTC as part of a brand refresh. It also introduced a new specialism subject called Health and Social Care.

Sponsors and partners
Buckinghamshire New University is the university sponsor of the UTC. Cisco, Trellix, Taylor Wimpey, BMW Group and Morgan Sindall are some of the college's other partners. Local employers of Aylesbury UTC include Alcom IT, The Freemantle Trust, Chiltern Rangers and Cloudy IT.

Admissions
Aylesbury UTC had an initial intake of students aged 14 and 16 (academic years 10 and 12) in 2013, but has expanded to accommodate students aged 14 to 19.

Facilities 
The building cost £10 million and has solar panels to provide sustainable energy to the facilities and local area. Computing facilities include an Apple Mac lab and multiple IT suites. Construction (Building Studies) facilities feature theory classrooms, painting and decorating suites, bricklaying area, practise plumbing rooms and equipment workshops. There is also a canteen on-site. The school has full disabled access and disabled toilets.

Curriculum
Aylesbury UTC teaches computing, health and construction (building studies). Pupils aged 14 to 19 follow a programme of study dedicated to one of the specialisms. These programmes include a compulsory core of GCSEs as well as technical courses that include Level 2 and Level 3 qualifications. Sixth form students have the option to study A Levels as well as BTEC National Certificates. The UTC also supports apprenticeships and work experience in conjunction with local partners.

From September 2022, a new specialist health subject is being offered. It will be provided alongside the existing computing and building studies subjects, and the core GCSEs.

References

External links
 Aylesbury UTC official website
Merchant Taylor's Oxfordshire Academy Trust website

Secondary schools in Buckinghamshire
University Technical Colleges
Buckinghamshire New University
Educational institutions established in 2013
2013 establishments in England